The men's ISSF 25 meter rapid fire pistol was a shooting sports event held as part of the Shooting at the 1924 Summer Olympics programme. It was the fifth appearance of the event (including the "muzzle-loading pistol" in 1896, the 20 metre pistol in 1900, 30 metre "dueling pistol" in 1912, and 30 metre "revolver" in 1920). The competition was held on 28 June 1924 at the shooting ranges at Versailles. 55 shooters from 17 nations competed. Nations were limited to four shooters each. Henry Bailey won the United States' second consecutive championship in the event (though separated by 12 years). Sweden also earned the same medal as in 1912, with Vilhelm Carlberg's silver. Lennart Hannelius took bronze in Finland's debut in the event.

Background

This was the fifth appearance of what would become standardised as the men's ISSF 25 meter rapid fire pistol event, the only event on the 2020 programme that traces back to 1896. The event has been held at every Summer Olympics except 1904 and 1928 (when no shooting events were held) and 1908; it was open to women from 1968 to 1980. The first five events were quite different, with the 1924 competition being the first that closely resembled a modern rapid fire pistol competition. The scoring system in 1924 was quite different from current scoring, however.

Eleven nations competed in the event for the first time: Argentina, Belgium, Czechoslovakia, Egypt, Finland, Italy, Mexico, the Netherlands, Norway, Poland, and Portugal. France, Great Britain, Greece, and the United States each made their third appearance in the event, tied for most of any nation.

Switzerland withdrew due to their pistols having too much recoil and their team being unable to afford the pistols used by other teams.

Competition format

The format was 18 shots in 3 series of 6 shots each. For each series, there were six separate standing silhouette targets that appeared for 10 seconds; the score for the string was how many targets were hit (there were no scoring rings). Maximum score was thus 18, 1 per shot. Ties were broken through additional series of shots, with the time reduced to 8 seconds per series. One series was shot at a time until the tie was broken.

Schedule

Results

A maximum of four competitors per nation were allowed. Three strings of six targets shot within ten seconds for a total of 18 targets. Afterwards for shoot-offs a string of six shots within eight seconds for six targets will keep being repeated until all ties are broken. The exact results of the shoot offs are unknown except order of elimination and the gold medal shoot-off.

Seven shoot-offs were needed to determine the gold medalist. Bailey's gun jammed after his first shot, but he coolly pulled the spent case out of the breech, and got off the five shots required in what remained of his eight-second time limit.

References

External links
 Official Report
 

Shooting at the 1924 Summer Olympics
Men's 1924